The 1964 Pittsburgh Pirates season was the 83rd in franchise history. The team finished tied for sixth in the National League with a record of 80–82, 13 games behind the St. Louis Cardinals.

Offseason 
 December 2, 1963: Byron Browne was drafted from the Pirates by the Chicago Cubs in the 1963 first-year draft.
 January 14, 1964: Dock Ellis was signed as an amateur free agent by the Pirates.
 Prior to 1964 season: John Lamb was signed as an amateur free agent by the Pirates.

Regular season

Season standings

Record vs. opponents

Game log

|- bgcolor="ffbbbb"
| 1 || April 14 || Cubs || 4–8 (10) || Jackson || Face (0–1) || McDaniel || 26,377 || 0–1
|- bgcolor="ccffcc"
| 2 || April 15 || Cubs || 5–4 (12) || Face (1–1) || Elston || — || 7,009 || 1–1
|- bgcolor="ccffcc"
| 3 || April 17 || @ Mets || 4–3 || Friend (1–0) || Bauta || — || 50,312 || 2–1
|- bgcolor="ccffcc"
| 4 || April 18 || @ Mets || 9–5 || Schwall (1–0) || Bearnarth || Face (1) || 31,480 || 3–1
|- bgcolor="ffbbbb"
| 5 || April 19 || @ Mets || 0–6 || Jackson || Veale (0–1) || — || 30,185 || 3–2
|- bgcolor="ccffcc"
| 6 || April 21 || @ Cubs || 8–5 || Face (2–1) || Norman || — || 3,222 || 4–2
|- bgcolor="ffbbbb"
| 7 || April 23 || @ Phillies || 5–6 || Baldschun || Face (2–2) || — || 12,851 || 4–3
|- bgcolor="ccffcc"
| 8 || April 24 || Mets || 9–4 || Friend (2–0) || Jackson || — || 7,903 || 5–3
|- bgcolor="ccffcc"
| 9 || April 25 || Mets || 5–4 || Veale (1–1) || Fisher || — || 5,470 || 6–3
|- bgcolor="ccffcc"
| 10 || April 26 || Mets || 4–3 || Bork (1–0) || Bearnarth || — ||  || 7–3
|- bgcolor="ffbbbb"
| 11 || April 26 || Mets || 2–3 || Stallard || Schwall (1–1) || Bauta || 13,524 || 7–4
|- bgcolor="ffbbbb"
| 12 || April 28 || @ Braves || 5–9 || Smith || Sisk (0–1) || Tiefenauer || 3,782 || 7–5
|- bgcolor="ffbbbb"
| 13 || April 29 || @ Braves || 0–1 || Cloninger || Veale (1–2) || — || 4,337 || 7–6
|-

|- bgcolor="ffbbbb"
| 14 || May 1 || @ Cardinals || 2–6 || Craig || Law (0–1) || — || 14,701 || 7–7
|- bgcolor="ccffcc"
| 15 || May 2 || @ Cardinals || 5–4 || Sisk (1–1) || Simmons || Bork (1) || 12,534 || 8–7
|- bgcolor="ccffcc"
| 16 || May 3 || @ Cardinals || 12–8 || Schwall (2–1) || Sadecki || Face (2) || 11,051 || 9–7
|- bgcolor="ccffcc"
| 17 || May 4 || @ Reds || 4–2 || Gibbon (1–0) || Jay || — || 3,355 || 10–7
|- bgcolor="ffbbbb"
| 18 || May 5 || @ Reds || 4–5 || Dickson || Law (0–2) || — || 4,096 || 10–8
|- bgcolor="ccffcc"
| 19 || May 6 || Cardinals || 1–0 || Friend (3–0) || Sadecki || — || 8,659 || 11–8
|- bgcolor="ffbbbb"
| 20 || May 7 || Cardinals || 2–4 || Simmons || Veale (1–3) || Craig || 7,219 || 11–9
|- bgcolor="ffbbbb"
| 21 || May 8 || Braves || 1–2 || Cloninger || Gibbon (1–1) || — || 11,508 || 11–10
|- bgcolor="ccffcc"
| 22 || May 9 || Braves || 10–0 || Law (1–2) || Lemaster || — || 6,536 || 12–10
|- bgcolor="ffbbbb"
| 23 || May 10 || Braves || 5–11 || Lemaster || Friend (3–1) || — ||  || 12–11
|- bgcolor="ccffcc"
| 24 || May 10 || Braves || 6–5 || McBean (1–0) || Tiefenauer || — || 16,430 || 13–11
|- bgcolor="ffbbbb"
| 25 || May 11 || Reds || 6–7 || Ellis || Sisk (1–2) || Henry || 5,902 || 13–12
|- bgcolor="ccffcc"
| 26 || May 12 || Reds || 3–2 || Gibbon (2–1) || Maloney || McBean (1) || 5,811 || 14–12
|- bgcolor="ffbbbb"
| 27 || May 15 || @ Dodgers || 0–6 || Ortega || Friend (3–2) || — || 33,507 || 14–13
|- bgcolor="ccffcc"
| 28 || May 16 || @ Dodgers || 7–4 || Veale (2–3) || Willhite || McBean (2) || 21,992 || 15–13
|- bgcolor="ffbbbb"
| 29 || May 17 || @ Dodgers || 2–3 || Koufax || Law (1–3) || Perranoski ||  || 15–14
|- bgcolor="ccffcc"
| 30 || May 17 || @ Dodgers || 8–3 || Gibbon (3–1) || Podres || Priddy (1) || 48,077 || 16–14
|- bgcolor="ccffcc"
| 31 || May 18 || @ Dodgers || 4–2 || Blass (1–0) || Drysdale || — || 23,621 || 17–14
|- bgcolor="ffbbbb"
| 32 || May 19 || @ Colt .45s || 1–3 || Bruce || Friend (3–3) || Woodeshick || 6,199 || 17–15
|- bgcolor="ccffcc"
| 33 || May 20 || @ Colt .45s || 4–3 || Veale (3–3) || Nottebart || McBean (3) || 5,715 || 18–15
|- bgcolor="ffbbbb"
| 34 || May 21 || @ Colt .45s || 1–3 || Farrell || Law (1–4) || Woodeshick || 5,880 || 18–16
|- bgcolor="ffbbbb"
| 35 || May 22 || @ Giants || 3–8 || Herbel || Blass (1–1) || MacKenzie || 18,873 || 18–17
|- bgcolor="ccffcc"
| 36 || May 23 || @ Giants || 9–2 || Friend (4–3) || Perry || — || 20,113 || 19–17
|- bgcolor="ccffcc"
| 37 || May 24 || @ Giants || 3–0 || Veale (4–3) || Sanford || — ||  || 20–17
|- bgcolor="ccffcc"
| 38 || May 24 || @ Giants || 5–3 || Butters (1–0) || Shaw || McBean (4) || 40,441 || 21–17
|- bgcolor="ccffcc"
| 39 || May 26 || Phillies || 13–4 || Law (2–4) || Short || — || 12,183 || 22–17
|- bgcolor="ffbbbb"
| 40 || May 27 || Phillies || 0–2 || Mahaffey || Friend (4–4) || — || 10,914 || 22–18
|- bgcolor="ccffcc"
| 41 || May 28 || Phillies || 6–5 || McBean (2–0) || Baldschun || — || 8,649 || 23–18
|- bgcolor="ffbbbb"
| 42 || May 29 || Dodgers || 1–4 || Moeller || Blass (1–2) || — || 16,114 || 23–19
|- bgcolor="ffbbbb"
| 43 || May 30 || Dodgers || 3–10 || Drysdale || Law (2–5) || — || 14,359 || 23–20
|- bgcolor="ffbbbb"
| 44 || May 31 || Dodgers || 4–6 || Koufax || Friend (4–5) || Perranoski || 9,354 || 23–21
|-

|- bgcolor="ccffcc"
| 45 || June 2 || Giants || 3–1 || Veale (5–3) || Hendley || — || 9,357 || 24–21
|- bgcolor="ffbbbb"
| 46 || June 3 || Giants || 0–3 || Herbel || Priddy (0–1) || — || 10,184 || 24–22
|- bgcolor="ccffcc"
| 47 || June 4 || Giants || 4–2 || Blass (2–2) || Bolin || — || 10,574 || 25–22
|- bgcolor="ccffcc"
| 48 || June 5 || Colt .45s || 4–3 || Priddy (1–1) || Woodeshick || — || 8,693 || 26–22
|- bgcolor="ffbbbb"
| 49 || June 7 || Colt .45s || 3–6 || Raymond || Priddy (1–2) || — ||  || 26–23
|- bgcolor="ccffcc"
| 50 || June 7 || Colt .45s || 6–1 || Law (3–5) || Bruce || — || 13,149 || 27–23
|- bgcolor="ffbbbb"
| 51 || June 9 || @ Phillies || 3–4 || Mahaffey || Gibbon (3–2) || Roebuck ||  || 27–24
|- bgcolor="ccffcc"
| 52 || June 9 || @ Phillies || 4–0 || Blass (3–2) || Culp || — || 32,155 || 28–24
|- bgcolor="ffbbbb"
| 53 || June 10 || @ Phillies || 1–4 || Short || Friend (4–6) || — || 15,352 || 28–25
|- bgcolor="ffbbbb"
| 54 || June 12 || @ Cubs || 1–7 || Buhl || Veale (5–4) || — || 7,575 || 28–26
|- bgcolor="ccffcc"
| 55 || June 13 || @ Cubs || 10–7 || Law (4–5) || Burdette || McBean (5) || 14,960 || 29–26
|- bgcolor="ffbbbb"
| 56 || June 14 || @ Cubs || 2–5 || Ellsworth || Blass (3–3) || — || 27,901 || 29–27
|- bgcolor="ccffcc"
| 57 || June 16 || Mets || 2–1 || Veale (6–4) || Fisher || — || 7,187 || 30–27
|- bgcolor="ccffcc"
| 58 || June 17 || Mets || 3–2 || Friend (5–6) || Stallard || — || 9,931 || 31–27
|- bgcolor="ccffcc"
| 59 || June 18 || Mets || 10–0 || Law (5–5) || Jackson || — || 7,110 || 32–27
|- bgcolor="ccffcc"
| 60 || June 20 || Cubs || 2–0 || Gibbon (4–2) || Broglio || McBean (6) || 7,455 || 33–27
|- bgcolor="ffbbbb"
| 61 || June 21 || Cubs || 1–2 || Jackson || Veale (6–5) || — ||  || 33–28
|- bgcolor="ffbbbb"
| 62 || June 21 || Cubs || 2–7 || Burdette || Blass (3–4) || McDaniel || 16,250 || 33–29
|- bgcolor="ccffcc"
| 63 || June 23 || @ Mets || 5–1 || Law (6–5) || Willey || McBean (7) || 25,764 || 34–29
|- bgcolor="ccffcc"
| 64 || June 24 || @ Mets || 3–1 || Friend (6–6) || Cisco || McBean (8) || 10,652 || 35–29
|- bgcolor="ccffcc"
| 65 || June 25 || @ Mets || 8–1 || Gibbon (5–2) || Fisher || — || 12,834 || 36–29
|- bgcolor="ccffcc"
| 66 || June 26 || Reds || 8–3 || Veale (7–5) || Jay || — || 19,197 || 37–29
|- bgcolor="ccffcc"
| 67 || June 27 || Reds || 4–2 || McBean (3–0) || Purkey || — || 8,460 || 38–29
|- bgcolor="ffbbbb"
| 68 || June 28 || Reds || 2–6 || Tsitouris || Law (6–6) || — ||  || 38–30
|- bgcolor="ffbbbb"
| 69 || June 28 || Reds || 5–6 || Maloney || Friend (6–7) || McCool || 21,788 || 38–31
|- bgcolor="ffbbbb"
| 70 || June 29 || @ Dodgers || 6–7 || Perranoski || Face (2–3) || — || 29,946 || 38–32
|-

|- bgcolor="ffbbbb"
| 71 || July 1 || @ Giants || 1–2 || Marichal || Veale (7–6) || — || 10,221 || 38–33
|- bgcolor="ffbbbb"
| 72 || July 2 || @ Giants || 5–6 || Hendley || Blass (3–5) || Shaw || 11,166 || 38–34
|- bgcolor="ccffcc"
| 73 || July 3 || @ Colt .45s || 2–1 || Law (7–6) || Owens || McBean (9) || 8,740 || 39–34
|- bgcolor="ffbbbb"
| 74 || July 4 || @ Colt .45s || 1–3 || Bruce || Friend (6–8) || — || 13,692 || 39–35
|- bgcolor="ccffcc"
| 75 || July 5 || @ Colt .45s || 7–1 || Gibbon (6–2) || Farrell || McBean (10) || 11,042 || 40–35
|- bgcolor="ccffcc"
| 76 || July 8 || Reds || 9–1 || Veale (8–6) || Maloney || McBean (11) || 7,031 || 41–35
|- bgcolor="ffbbbb"
| 77 || July 9 || Braves || 6–11 || Spahn || Law (7–7) || Sadowski || 9,295 || 41–36
|- bgcolor="ccffcc"
| 78 || July 10 || Braves || 5–1 || Friend (7–8) || Cloninger || — || 13,148 || 42–36
|- bgcolor="ffbbbb"
| 79 || July 11 || Braves || 8–9 (11) || Cloninger || Sisk (1–3) || Olivo || 7,874 || 42–37
|- bgcolor="ffbbbb"
| 80 || July 13 || Cardinals || 4–5 (12) || Taylor || Sisk (1–4) || — ||  || 42–38
|- bgcolor="ffbbbb"
| 81 || July 13 || Cardinals || 5–12 || Cuellar || Law (7–8) || Washburn || 14,773 || 42–39
|- bgcolor="ccffcc"
| 82 || July 14 || Phillies || 4–3 || Veale (9–6) || McLish || McBean (12) || 9,664 || 43–39
|- bgcolor="ccffcc"
| 83 || July 15 || Phillies || 3–0 || Friend (8–8) || Bunning || — || 11,633 || 44–39
|- bgcolor="ffbbbb"
| 84 || July 16 || Phillies || 5–7 || Mahaffey || Gibbon (6–3) || Baldschun || 12,163 || 44–40
|- bgcolor="ccffcc"
| 85 || July 18 || @ Braves || 8–2 || Veale (10–6) || Spahn || — || 17,192 || 45–40
|- bgcolor="ffbbbb"
| 86 || July 19 || @ Braves || 2–6 || Cloninger || Friend (8–9) || — ||  || 45–41
|- bgcolor="ffbbbb"
| 87 || July 19 || @ Braves || 4–5 || Lemaster || Blass (3–6) || Fischer || 23,989 || 45–42
|- bgcolor="ccffcc"
| 88 || July 21 || @ Cardinals || 8–4 || Gibbon (7–3) || Sadecki || Bork (2) || 11,805 || 46–42
|- bgcolor="ccffcc"
| 89 || July 22 || @ Cardinals || 13–2 || Veale (11–6) || Craig || — || 11,089 || 47–42
|- bgcolor="ccffcc"
| 90 || July 23 || @ Cardinals || 8–5 || Blass (4–6) || Cuellar || Face (3) || 7,893 || 48–42
|- bgcolor="ffbbbb"
| 91 || July 24 || @ Reds || 0–2 || O'Toole || Friend (8–10) || — || 14,317 || 48–43
|- bgcolor="ccffcc"
| 92 || July 25 || @ Reds || 6–3 || Law (8–8) || Nuxhall || McBean (13) || 6,534 || 49–43
|- bgcolor="ffbbbb"
| 93 || July 26 || @ Reds || 2–7 || Jay || Gibbon (7–4) || Ellis ||  || 49–44
|- bgcolor="ccffcc"
| 94 || July 26 || @ Reds || 5–1 || Veale (12–6) || Tsitouris || — || 14,814 || 50–44
|- bgcolor="ccffcc"
| 95 || July 29 || Colt .45s || 5–2 || Friend (9–10) || Farrell || — || 8,572 || 51–44
|- bgcolor="ccffcc"
| 96 || July 30 || Colt .45s || 1–0 || Law (9–8) || Bruce || — ||  || 52–44
|- bgcolor="ccffcc"
| 97 || July 30 || Colt .45s || 8–3 || Schwall (3–1) || Owens || McBean (14) || 11,314 || 53–44
|- bgcolor="ffbbbb"
| 98 || July 31 || Giants || 6–8 || Shaw || Veale (12–7) || O'Dell || 28,076 || 53–45
|-

|- bgcolor="ccffcc"
| 99 || August 1 || Giants || 6–1 || Gibbon (8–4) || Herbel || — || 15,882 || 54–45
|- bgcolor="ffbbbb"
| 100 || August 2 || Giants || 1–2 || Pregenzer || Friend (9–11) || O'Dell || 22,402 || 54–46
|- bgcolor="ccffcc"
| 101 || August 3 || Giants || 3–2 || McBean (4–0) || O'Dell || — || 12,465 || 55–46
|- bgcolor="ffbbbb"
| 102 || August 4 || Dodgers || 1–5 || Koufax || Veale (12–8) || Miller ||  || 55–47
|- bgcolor="ffbbbb"
| 103 || August 4 || Dodgers || 7–10 || Moeller || Schwall (3–2) || Perranoski || 25,807 || 55–48
|- bgcolor="ccffcc"
| 104 || August 5 || Dodgers || 4–3 || McBean (5–0) || Perranoski || — || 11,071 || 56–48
|- bgcolor="ccffcc"
| 105 || August 6 || Dodgers || 4–1 || Friend (10–11) || Miller || — || 10,599 || 57–48
|- bgcolor="ffbbbb"
| 106 || August 7 || Cubs || 3–7 || Jackson || Law (9–9) || — ||  || 57–49
|- bgcolor="ffbbbb"
| 107 || August 7 || Cubs || 3–4 || Broglio || Blass (4–7) || Shantz || 13,862 || 57–50
|- bgcolor="ccffcc"
| 108 || August 8 || Cubs || 5–2 || Veale (13–8) || Burdette || — || 6,845 || 58–50
|- bgcolor="ccffcc"
| 109 || August 9 || Cubs || 2–0 || Schwall (4–2) || Buhl || McBean (15) || 11,305 || 59–50
|- bgcolor="ffbbbb"
| 110 || August 11 || Mets || 2–3 (8) || Fisher || Friend (10–12) || — || 8,542 || 59–51
|- bgcolor="ccffcc"
| 111 || August 12 || Mets || 5–4 || Gibbon (9–4) || Ribant || McBean (16) || 6,677 || 60–51
|- bgcolor="ccffcc"
| 112 || August 14 || @ Cubs || 3–2 || McBean (6–0) || Shantz || — ||  || 61–51
|- bgcolor="ffbbbb"
| 113 || August 14 || @ Cubs || 2–4 || Burdette || Law (9–10) || — || 12,634 || 61–52
|- bgcolor="ccffcc"
| 114 || August 15 || @ Cubs || 5–4 || McBean (7–0) || McDaniel || — || 23,003 || 62–52
|- bgcolor="ffbbbb"
| 115 || August 16 || @ Cubs || 4–5 || Elston || McBean (7–1) || — ||  || 62–53
|- bgcolor="ccffcc"
| 116 || August 16 || @ Cubs || 7–4 || Blass (5–7) || Slaughter || Face (4) || 22,376 || 63–53
|- bgcolor="ffbbbb"
| 117 || August 17 || @ Mets || 0–5 || Ribant || Veale (13–9) || — || 12,350 || 63–54
|- bgcolor="ffbbbb"
| 118 || August 18 || @ Mets || 3–7 || Jackson || Gibbon (9–5) || — || 18,905 || 63–55
|- bgcolor="ffbbbb"
| 119 || August 19 || @ Mets || 2–4 || Stallard || Law (9–11) || — || 19,192 || 63–56
|- bgcolor="ffbbbb"
| 120 || August 20 || @ Phillies || 0–2 || Mahaffey || Friend (10–13) || — ||  || 63–57
|- bgcolor="ffbbbb"
| 121 || August 20 || @ Phillies || 2–3 || Wise || Schwall (4–3) || Roebuck || 35,814 || 63–58
|- bgcolor="ffbbbb"
| 122 || August 21 || @ Phillies || 0–2 || Short || Veale (13–10) || — || 30,170 || 63–59
|- bgcolor="ccffcc"
| 123 || August 22 || @ Phillies || 9–4 || Bork (2–0) || Bennett || McBean (17) || 14,955 || 64–59
|- bgcolor="ffbbbb"
| 124 || August 23 || @ Phillies || 3–9 || Bunning || Gibbon (9–6) || Boozer || 19,213 || 64–60
|- bgcolor="ffbbbb"
| 125 || August 24 || @ Cardinals || 1–5 || Gibson || Friend (10–14) || — || 10,881 || 64–61
|- bgcolor="ffbbbb"
| 126 || August 25 || @ Cardinals || 6–7 (13) || Taylor || McBean (7–2) || — || 8,664 || 64–62
|- bgcolor="ffbbbb"
| 127 || August 26 || @ Cardinals || 2–4 || Cuellar || Bork (2–1) || — || 9,662 || 64–63
|- bgcolor="ccffcc"
| 128 || August 28 || Phillies || 4–2 || Face (3–3) || Roebuck || — || 20,374 || 65–63
|- bgcolor="ffbbbb"
| 129 || August 29 || Phillies || 8–10 || Mahaffey || Friend (10–15) || Baldschun || 12,186 || 65–64
|- bgcolor="ccffcc"
| 130 || August 30 || Phillies || 10–2 || Veale (14–10) || Short || — || 14,080 || 66–64
|-

|- bgcolor="ccffcc"
| 131 || September 1 || Dodgers || 5–2 || Friend (11–15) || Ortega || — || 6,648 || 67–64
|- bgcolor="ffbbbb"
| 132 || September 2 || Dodgers || 5–8 (12) || Miller || Law (9–12) || — || 7,109 || 67–65
|- bgcolor="ccffcc"
| 133 || September 4 || Colt .45s || 10–2 || Veale (15–10) || Bruce || — || 6,133 || 68–65
|- bgcolor="ccffcc"
| 134 || September 5 || Colt .45s || 4–1 || Friend (12–15) || Johnson || — || 4,272 || 69–65
|- bgcolor="ccffcc"
| 135 || September 6 || Colt .45s || 1–0 || Law (10–12) || Nottebart || — || 4,886 || 70–65
|- bgcolor="ffbbbb"
| 136 || September 7 || Giants || 4–6 || Perry || Gibbon (9–7) || Duffalo ||  || 70–66
|- bgcolor="ffbbbb"
| 137 || September 7 || Giants || 6–9 || Pregenzer || Bork (2–2) || Shaw || 14,948 || 70–67
|- bgcolor="ccffcc"
| 138 || September 9 || Reds || 4–1 || Veale (16–10) || Jay || McBean (18) || 5,245 || 71–67
|- bgcolor="ffbbbb"
| 139 || September 10 || Reds || 0–3 || Purkey || Friend (12–16) || — || 4,993 || 71–68
|- bgcolor="ccffcc"
| 140 || September 11 || @ Colt .45s || 3–0 || Law (11–12) || Nottebart || — || 4,042 || 72–68
|- bgcolor="ffbbbb"
| 141 || September 12 || @ Colt .45s || 1–2 || Larsen || Butters (1–1) || Woodeshick || 7,308 || 72–69
|- bgcolor="ccffcc"
| 142 || September 13 || @ Colt .45s || 3–0 || Cardwell (1–0) || Farrell || — || 3,370 || 73–69
|- bgcolor="ccffcc"
| 143 || September 14 || @ Dodgers || 7–2 || Veale (17–10) || Reed || — || 16,625 || 74–69
|- bgcolor="ffbbbb"
| 144 || September 15 || @ Dodgers || 3–5 || Miller || Friend (12–17) || Miller || 14,920 || 74–70
|- bgcolor="ccffcc"
| 145 || September 16 || @ Dodgers || 7–5 || Law (12–12) || Ortega || McBean (19) || 15,049 || 75–70
|- bgcolor="ccffcc"
| 146 || September 18 || @ Giants || 4–3 || Veale (18–10) || Shaw || McBean (20) || 9,741 || 76–70
|- bgcolor="ffbbbb"
| 147 || September 19 || @ Giants || 4–13 || Marichal || Friend (12–18) || — || 11,012 || 76–71
|- bgcolor="ffbbbb"
| 148 || September 20 || @ Giants || 3–4 (11) || Duffalo || McBean (7–3) || — || 15,548 || 76–72
|- bgcolor="ffbbbb"
| 149 || September 22 || Braves || 0–2 || Lemaster || Veale (18–11) || — || 3,680 || 76–73
|- bgcolor="ccffcc"
| 150 || September 23 || Braves || 7–4 || Gibbon (10–7) || Cloninger || — || 2,776 || 77–73
|- bgcolor="ffbbbb"
| 151 || September 24 || Cardinals || 2–4 || Gibson || Wood (0–1) || — ||  || 77–74
|- bgcolor="ffbbbb"
| 152 || September 24 || Cardinals || 0–4 || Sadecki || Butters (1–2) || — || 2,846 || 77–75
|- bgcolor="ffbbbb"
| 153 || September 25 || Cardinals || 3–5 || Richardson || Cardwell (1–1) || Schultz || 3,694 || 77–76
|- bgcolor="ffbbbb"
| 154 || September 26 || Cardinals || 3–6 || Simmons || Veale (18–12) || Schultz || 4,085 || 77–77
|- bgcolor="ffbbbb"
| 155 || September 27 || Cardinals || 0–5 || Craig || Law (12–13) || Schultz || 19,287 || 77–78
|- bgcolor="ccffcc"
| 156 || September 29 || @ Reds || 2–0 || Friend (13–18) || McCool || — || 10,858 || 78–78
|- bgcolor="ccffcc"
| 157 || September 30 || @ Reds || 1–0 (16) || McBean (8–3) || Tsitouris || — || 8,188 || 79–78
|-

|- bgcolor="ffbbbb"
| 158 || October 1 || @ Reds || 4–5 || Nuxhall || Blass (5–8) || Ellis || 7,081 || 79–79
|- bgcolor="ffbbbb"
| 159 || October 2 || @ Braves || 2–3 (10) || Cloninger || Wood (0–2) || — ||  || 79–80
|- bgcolor="ccffcc"
| 160 || October 2 || @ Braves || 5–4 || Butters (2–2) || Schneider || McBean (21) || 7,800 || 80–80
|- bgcolor="ffbbbb"
| 161 || October 3 || @ Braves || 5–11 || Umbach || Cardwell (1–2) || Spahn || 5,636 || 80–81
|- bgcolor="ffbbbb"
| 162 || October 4 || @ Braves || 0–6 || Sadowski || Francis (0–1) || Spahn || 10,079 || 80–82
|-

|-
| Legend:       = Win       = LossBold = Pirates team member

Opening Day lineup

Notable transactions 
 June 13, 1964: Al Oliver was signed as an amateur free agent by the Pirates.
 September 6, 1964: Wilbur Wood was purchased by the Pirates from the Boston Red Sox.
 September 12, 1964: Smoky Burgess was selected off waivers from the Pirates by the Chicago White Sox.

Roster

Statistics
Batting
Note: G = Games played; AB = At bats; H = Hits; Avg. = Batting average; HR = Home runs; RBI = Runs batted in

Pitching
Note: G = Games pitched; IP = Innings pitched; W = Wins; L = Losses; ERA = Earned run average; SO = Strikeouts

Farm system

Notes

References 
 1964 Pittsburgh Pirates at Baseball Reference
 1964 Pittsburgh Pirates at Baseball Almanac

Pittsburgh Pirates seasons
Pittsburgh Pirates season
1964 in sports in Pennsylvania